The 1992 South American Cross Country Championships took place on January 4–5, 1992.  The races were held at the Jóckey Club in São Paulo, Brazil.

Medal winners, and medal winners for junior and youth competitions were published.

Medallists

Medal table (unofficial)

Participation
Athletes from at least 4 countries participated.

See also
 1992 in athletics (track and field)

References

External links
 GBRathletics

South American Cross Country Championships
South American Cross Country Championships
South American Cross Country Championships
South American Cross Country Championships
1992 South American Cross Country Championships
Cross country running in Brazil
January 1992 sports events in South America